Ronsdorf is a district of the German city of Wuppertal.  It has population of about 22,500. Ronsdorf was first mentioned in 1494, and in 1745 it received its town charter. It was founded only a few years before by Elias Eller when he relocated the Zionites there from Elberfeld. Ronsdorf was made a part of Wuppertal in 1929. 

Ronsdorf consists, in addition to the town Ronsdorf, of the villages of Heidt, Erbschlö, Holthausen, Blombach, Linde, Marscheid, Großsporkert, Kleinsporkert and Kleinbeek.

Ronsdorf was heavily destroyed during the allied bombings of World War II on the night of May 29, 1943, therefore only a few old buildings (like the typical black and white timber-framed "Bergisches Haus") remain today.

Sights

 Water supply dam (Ronsdorfer Talsperre)
 Ribbon makers memorial (Bandwirker-Denkmal) (ribbon making has always been one of the major businesses in Ronsdorf)
 Museum of Ribbon Making (Bandwirkermuseum)
 Lutheran church, built in 1793, making it the oldest church in Ronsdorf
 Reformed church, built in 1858
 Catholic church, a modern concrete building

Regular Events
The "Liefersack" is a bi-annual festival (odd years), organised by local clubs and businesses. The main purpose is to collect money for several charities. 

In the even years, the "Ronsdorfer Bürgerfest" takes place, which has the character of a fair.

Persons
Rudolf Carnap was born in Ronsdorf.

Towns in North Rhine-Westphalia
Wuppertal